The Amateur Gentleman is a 1926 American silent drama film produced by Inspiration Pictures and distributed through First National Pictures. It was directed by Sidney Olcott as a vehicle for star Richard Barthelmess.

The same story was made into a 1920 British silent film and would be filmed again in 1936 with Douglas Fairbanks, Jr.

The Amateur Gentleman is preserved in the George Eastman House Motion Picture Collection.

Cast
Richard Barthelmess as Barnabas Barty
Dorothy Dunbar as Lady Cleone Meredith
Gardner James as Ronald Barrymaine
Nigel Barrie as Sir Mortimer Carnaby
Brandon Hurst as Peterby
John Miljan as Viscount Devenham
Edwards Davis as John Barty
Billie Bennett as Duchess of Camberhurst
Herbert Grimwood as Jasper Gaunt
Gino Corrado as Prince Regent
Sidney De Gray as Captain Chumley
Hans Joby as Captain Slingsby

Production notes
The film was shot at Clune studios, Melrose Avenue, Hollywood, and at the Samuel S. Hinds house in Pasadena.

References

External links

AFI Catalog

The Amateur Gentleman at website dedicated to Sidney Olcott

1926 films
American silent feature films
First National Pictures films
Films directed by Sidney Olcott
American black-and-white films
Films set in London
Films set in the 1810s
Films based on British novels
American remakes of British films
1920s historical drama films
American historical drama films
1926 drama films
1920s English-language films
Cultural depictions of George IV
1920s American films
Silent American drama films